Disney Fairies: Faith, Trust, and Pixie Dust is a compilation album featuring songs from and inspired by the Disney Fairies film series. It was also used to promote the Secret of the Wings film. The soundtrack was released on October 16, 2012, and contains "The Great Divide" from the McClain Sisters official music video.

Album information
The score to the film was composed by Joel McNeely, who scored the first four Tinker Bell films. The songs were written by Brendan Milburn and Valerie Vigoda of GrooveLily. In the movie, Sydney Sierota from Echosmith sings the opening song, "We'll Be There", while the album version is sung by Thia Megia. "The Great Divide" is sung by the McClain Sisters. This album also includes singles from Disney Channel stars, such as Zendaya from Shake It Up, Bridgit Mendler from Good Luck Charlie, Demi Lovato from Camp Rock and Sonny with a Chance, Laura Marano from Austin & Ally, Tiffany Thornton from Sonny with a Chance, and Selena Gomez from Wizards of Waverly Place. They perform "Dig Down Deeper", "How To Believe", "Gift of a Friend", "Shine", "Magic Mirror", and "Fly to Your Heart", respectively.

Sabrina Carpenter, who performed "Smile" on the album, was largely unknown at the time, but had appeared in an unaired Disney Channel pilot, Gulliver Quinn. Shortly after the album's release, she was cast in the series Girl Meets World.

Track listing

Chart performance

The Great Divide

"The Great Divide" is a song by American recording artists McClain Sisters from the Disney Fairies film series's compilation Disney Fairies: Faith, Trust, and Pixie Dust. The song was composed by Brendan Milburn and Valerie Vigoda. It was also includes in the scenes of the film Secret of the Wings, released in 2012.

Charts

Release history

References

External links

 
 

2012 soundtrack albums
Walt Disney Records soundtracks
Tinker Bell (film series)
Fantasy film soundtracks